Gianluigi Savoldi (9 June 1949, in Gorlago – 13 April 2008, in Bergamo) was an Italian professional footballer who played as a midfielder.

His older brother Giuseppe Savoldi and nephew Gianluca Savoldi (Giuseppe's son) also played football professionally.

Honours
Juventus
 Serie A champion: 1971–72.

1949 births
2008 deaths
Italian footballers
Serie A players
Atalanta B.C. players
Juventus F.C. players
A.C. Cesena players
L.R. Vicenza players
U.C. Sampdoria players
Giulianova Calcio players
U.S. Livorno 1915 players
Association football midfielders